Claude Reignier Conder (29 December 1848, Cheltenham – 16 February 1910, Cheltenham) was an English soldier, explorer and antiquarian.  He was a great-great-grandson of Louis-François Roubiliac and grandson of editor and author Josiah Conder.

Conder was educated at University College London and the Royal Military Academy, Woolwich.  He became a lieutenant in the Corps of Royal Engineers in 1870.  He carried out survey work in Palestine in 1872–1874, latterly in conjunction with Lt Kitchener, later Lord Kitchener, whom he had met at school, and was seconded to the Palestine Exploration Fund from 1875 to 1878 and again in 1881 and 1882, when he was promoted captain.  He retired with the rank of colonel in 1904.

Conder joined the expedition to Egypt in 1882, under Sir Garnet Wolseley, to suppress the rebellion of Arabi Pasha. He was appointed a deputy assistant adjutant and quartermaster-general on the staff of the intelligence department. In Egypt his perfect knowledge of Arabic and of Eastern people proved most useful. He was present at the action of Kassassin, the Battle of Tel el-Kebir, and the advance to Cairo, but then, seized with typhoid fever, he was invalided home. For his services he received the war medal with clasp for Tel el-Kebir, the Khedive's bronze star and the fourth class of the Order of the Medjidie.

While surveying the area of Safed in July 1875, Conder and his party were attacked by local residents and Conder sustained a serious head injury which left him bedridden for a while and unable to return to Palestine. The work of surveying the country of Palestine commenced again only in late February 1877, without Conder.

Publications
 1878: Tent Work in Palestine 
 1879: Judas Maccabæus, and the Jewish War of Independence
 1880: Memoires: The Survey of Western and Eastern Palestine 
 1883: Heth and Moab, Explorations in Syria in 1881 and 1882
 1886: Syrian Stone-lore, Or, The Monumental History of Palestine
 1887: Altaic Hieroglyphs and Hittite Inscriptions  
 1889: Palestine
 1889: The Survey of Eastern Palestine, Memoirs of the Topography, Orography, Hydrography, Archaeology, Etc.
 1893: The Tell Amarna Tablets
 1896: The Bible and the East
 1897: The Latin Kingdom of Jerusalem
 1898: The Hittites and their Language
 1900: The Hebrew Tragedy
 1902: The First Bible
 1909: The City of Jerusalem

Books (with online access)
Conder, Claude Reignier (1879)  Tent Work in Palestine, vol 1
Conder, Claude Reignier (1879)  Tent Work in Palestine, vol 2
 (The full text, archive.org, Can download PDF)
 (The full text, archive.org, Can download PDF)
Conder, Claude Reignier and  H.H. Kitchener   (1881): The Survey of Western Palestine: memoirs of the topography, orography, hydrography, and archaeology. London:Committee of the Palestine Exploration Fund. vol 3 The full text, archive.org, Can download PDF.

Articles (with online access)

References

External links

 
 
 
 Profile at PEF website
 Claude Reignier Conder at Find a Grave

1848 births
1910 deaths
English explorers
Royal Engineers officers
People from Cheltenham
Graduates of the Royal Military Academy, Woolwich
Alumni of University College London
Palestinologists
Historical geographers